Solace is a 2015 American mystery thriller film directed by Afonso Poyart and starring Anthony Hopkins, Colin Farrell, Jeffrey Dean Morgan and Abbie Cornish. The film was released on December 16, 2016, by Lionsgate Premiere. The film is about a psychic doctor, John Clancy (Anthony Hopkins), who works with FBI special agent Joe Merriwether (Jeffrey Dean Morgan) in search of serial killer Charles Ambrose (Colin Farrell). The film's script was originally planned and developed as a sequel to the 1995 thriller film Se7en, but the idea was eventually scrapped. Solace was completed as a standalone film.

Plot
Dr. John Clancy has lived in isolation since the death of his daughter two years ago. The psychic is contacted by his friend Joe Merriwether, an FBI special agent, who asks for his help in tracking down a serial killer with very elaborate methods. Joe seems unable to convince Clancy, but when his partner Katherine Cowles enters and touches Clancy on the shoulder after giving him the case files, Clancy envisions a violent future event with blood spilling down Katherine's forehead, among other insights into her life. Clancy reluctantly agrees. FBI special agent Cowles, Merriwether's partner, is skeptical of Clancy's gift, but is soon convinced otherwise.

The victims all found to have been suffering from terminal illnesses. Clancy realizes the killer has abilities exceeding his own. Merriwether is shot by the suspect. He says that he was diagnosed with terminal cancer before dying in the hospital. After the funeral, Clancy is confronted by the killer, who explains he is sparing his victims from a slow death, killing them out of mercy, and that he arranged Merriwether's death. He arrogantly declares he has seen all the possible outcomes of their confrontation, but Clancy surprises him. Nonetheless, the killer escapes after distracting police by saying Clancy has a gun.

Cowles discovers the killer is a man called Charles Ambrose. Clancy is forced to test his abilities to their limits and is able to intercept Ambrose as he poisons his latest victim. Clancy tells him he has no right to take time away from even the terminally ill, such as his friend Merriwether.

Cowles and Clancy finally confront Ambrose in a subway car. Ambrose tells Clancy that he is dying and asks Clancy to shoot him. He wants Clancy to take over the role of mercy killing and warns him that Cowles will be killed if he does not shoot him. Cowles runs up behind Clancy and both Ambrose and Clancy fire their weapons. Ambrose dies and Clancy is injured. Clancy and Cowles become close, and Clancy sees Cowles as the daughter he lost. In the hospital, Clancy gives Cowles a letter for his wife, with whom Clancy reconciles. He recalls euthanizing his own daughter as she was dying from leukemia.

Cast

 Anthony Hopkins as John Clancy
 Colin Farrell as Charles Ambrose
 Jeffrey Dean Morgan as Agent Joe Merriwether
 Abbie Cornish as Agent Katherine Cowles
 Jordan Woods-Robinson as Jeffrey Oldfield
 Marley Shelton as Laura Merriwether
 Xander Berkeley as Mr. Ellis
 Kenny Johnson as David Raymond
 Janine Turner as Elizabeth Clancy
 Sharon Lawrence as Mrs. Ellis
 Jose Pablo Cantillo as Sawyer
 Matt Gerald as Sloman
 Autumn Dial as Emma Clancy
 Joshua Close as Linus Harp
 Luisa Moraes as Victoria Raymond

Production

The original script was written by Ted Griffin and Disney executive Sean Bailey in 2000. James Vanderbilt contributed to the script and final changes were made by Peter Morgan; neither were credited on the final film. At one point the script was picked up by New Line Cinema and intended to be rewritten as a sequel to Se7en, tentatively titled Ei8ht, with Morgan Freeman returning as Det. William Somerset, who would have developed psychic powers. The idea was eventually dropped when Se7en director David Fincher responded negatively to the idea, and the film was subsequently rewritten as a standalone project. In 2008, Mark Pellington was announced to direct the film.

On May 10, 2012, it was announced that Brazilian director Afonso Poyart was attached to direct.

Principal photography began in May 2013 in Atlanta, Georgia.

Release
The film made its premiere in Turkey on April 24, 2015, before receiving a screening at the 2015 Toronto International Film Festival on September 9, 2015. The film was originally scheduled to be released on September 2, 2016, by Relativity Media. In October 2016, Lionsgate Premiere acquired U.S rights to the film, and set it for a December 16, 2016, release.

Reception
On review aggregator Rotten Tomatoes, the film has a rating of 25% based on 51 reviews and an average score of 4.18/10. The site's consensus reads, "Solace boasts a talented cast and a somewhat intriguing premise, but they're outweighed by a plodding story that teeters between tired clichés and ludicrous twists." On Metacritic, the film has a weighted average score of 36% based on reviews from 12 critics, indicating "Generally unfavorable reviews".

Peter Debruge of Variety called it a "corny but clever serial killer thriller" whose cast makes the film work. Bernard Besserglik of The Hollywood Reporter wrote that the film is not as good as its inspiration, but the chemistry between Hopkins and Farrell makes it worth showing theatrically despite the film's reputation for having a troubled production.

Peter Bradshaw of The Guardian wrote "This could be one of those rare and terrifying serial killer cases where the psychotic culprit apparently intends to bore and embarrass everyone to death with bad acting." Tim Robey of The Telegraph calls the film a misfire and blames director Afonso Poyart and his unusual editing and zooming.

References

External links
 
 
 
 
 

2015 films
2015 thriller films
2010s American films
2010s English-language films
2010s mystery thriller films
2010s serial killer films
American mystery thriller films
American serial killer films
Films about cancer
Films about the Federal Bureau of Investigation
Films directed by Afonso Poyart
Films produced by Beau Flynn
Films scored by BT (musician)
Films shot in Atlanta
Films with screenplays by Ted Griffin
FilmNation Entertainment films
Lionsgate films
Poisoning in film